Real Heroes Award,  is a social initiative by CNN-IBN in collaboration with Reliance Industries, instituted in 2008 to honour Indians for their contribution to society. The objective of recognising the ordinary citizens who have devoted their lives towards shaping a better society. The first annual ceremony was in 2008, and featured 24 awards.

Jury
Judged by a panel of the selection process involves checking of quoted events, persons and places.

Slogan
Ordinary People Extraordinary Service

Categories
Honouring unsung heroes every year, the award acknowledges the service of people in diverse fields including:
 Women Empowerment
 Youth
 Social Welfare
 Health& Disability
 Education& Children
 Sports
 Environment
 A Life Time Achievement Award is also given to a person who has dedicated his/her life towards the betterment of the society.

Images

References

External links

  Official site
Real Heroes

Indian awards
Awards established in 2008
Humanitarian and service awards